David Feito Vélez (born 19 December 1982 in Coria del Río, Province of Seville) is a Spanish former footballer who played as a left-back.

External links

1982 births
Living people
People from Coria del Río
Sportspeople from the Province of Seville
Spanish footballers
Footballers from Andalusia
Association football defenders
Segunda División players
Segunda División B players
Tercera División players
Coria CF players
CD Utrera players
Córdoba CF B players
Córdoba CF players
RCD Espanyol B footballers
Logroñés CF footballers
CD Guadalajara (Spain) footballers
Universidad de Las Palmas CF footballers
CD Teruel footballers
Pontevedra CF footballers
Extremadura UD footballers
Extremadura UD B players
Arcos CF players